The Irish League in season 1964–65 comprised 12 teams, and Derry City won the championship.

League standings

Results

Top scorers

References
Northern Ireland - List of final tables (RSSSF)

NIFL Premiership seasons
1964–65 in Northern Ireland association football
Northern